The La Lande Muree Formation is a geologic formation in France. It preserves fossils dating back to the Silurian period.

See also

 List of fossiliferous stratigraphic units in France

References
 

Geologic formations of France
Silurian System of Europe
Silurian France
Silurian south paleopolar deposits